Charlotte Schwab (born 17 December 1952) is a Swiss stage and television actress. She is best known for her performance as Anna Engelhardt in Alarm für Cobra 11 – Die Autobahnpolizei.

References

External links 

1952 births
Living people
Swiss television actresses
Swiss stage actresses